Afasi may refer to 

Aphasia, an impairment of language ability
Afasi, nickname for Swedish hip hop artist Herbert Munkhammar, part of Afasi & Filthy, Maskinen and Ansiktet  
Afasi & Filthy, Swedish hip hop duo
Mishari Rashid Al-Afasy, Kuwaiti sheikh, a qari and a munshid
Hamad Al-Afasi, a shooting sportsman